Ceromitia elongatella is a species of moth of the Adelidae family. It is known from South Africa.

References

Adelidae
Endemic moths of South Africa
Moths described in 1881